The 1974 Tennessee gubernatorial election was held on November 5, 1974. Democratic nominee Ray Blanton defeated Republican nominee Lamar Alexander with 55.4% of the vote.

Primary elections
Primary elections were held on August 1, 1974.

Democratic primary

Candidates
Ray Blanton, former U.S. Representative, candidate in the 1972 U.S. Senate election.
Jake Butcher, businessman
Thomas A. Wiseman Jr., former Tennessee State Treasurer
Hudley Crockett, news anchor
Franklin Haney, businessman
Stan Snodgrass
Ross Bass, former United States Senator
Washington Butler
David Pack
James Powers
Jonnie D. Elkins
Charles Gordon Vick, perennial candidate

Results

Republican primary

Candidates
Lamar Alexander, attorney
Nat T. Winston Jr., former Commissioner of Mental Health for Tennessee
Dortch Oldham, businessman
Melvin Waldron

Results

General election

Candidates
Major party candidates
Ray Blanton, Democratic
Lamar Alexander, Republican 

Other candidates
Jack Comer, Independent
Alfred W. Taylor, Independent
James Reesor, Independent
Hubert David Patty, Independent
Arnold Joseph Zandi, Independent

Results

References

1974
Gubernatorial
Tennessee